Leslie Phillip "Les" Vernon (29 May 1880 – 11 May 1957) was a former Australian sportsman who represented Victoria in the Sheffield Shield and played Australian rules football with Carlton and South Melbourne in the Victorian Football League (VFL).

See also
 List of Victoria first-class cricketers

Notes

External links 		
		
Les Vernon's profile at Blueseum
 		

		
1880 births		
1957 deaths		
Australian rules footballers from Melbourne
Carlton Football Club players		
Sydney Swans players
Australian cricketers
Victoria cricketers
Cricketers from Melbourne